A sea switch is a submersible switching unit in marine technology.

References

Switches